Rossia Mall is an enclosed shopping mall located on Tigran Mets Avenue in the Armenian capital Yerevan. It is the 3rd-largest mall built in Yerevan. The shopping centre was opened on 5 March 2016, with the presence of president Serzh Sargsyan. It has a direct access to the General Andranik underground station, adjacent to the Rossia Theatre.

The shopping centre was built by the "Sil Concern" LLC owned by the Armenian businessman Khachatur Sukiasyan. The entire cost of the project was around US$ 15 million.

The mall is home to one of the largest jewelry centres in Yerevan.

Entertainment
The mall has a number of cafes and restaurants as well as a food court. It is also home to the "Play Space" children's playground.

Stores
Rossia Mall is home to a variety of retailers including:
Adidas
LC Waikiki
Tvoe Clothing
DeFacto Fashion
OVS
Miniso
Shustov Trading House
Real Store (department store)

References

Shopping malls in Armenia
Tourist attractions in Yerevan
Buildings and structures in Yerevan
Shopping malls established in 2016
2016 establishments in Armenia